is a Japanese former professional boxer who competed from 1973 to 1979. He held the WBA and lineal super welterweight titles from 1978 to 1979.

Biography 
Kudo was an amateur wrestler during high school, and only became a professional boxer when he failed to join the Japanese Olympic wrestling team for the 1972 Munich Olympics. He made his professional debut in May, 1973, and won the Japanese middleweight title in his 6th professional fight. He defended the title 8 times before returning it to Japanese Boxing Commission.

In 1978, he moved down to the light middleweight division to challenge Eddie Gazo for the WBA and lineal light middleweight titles. Kudo won by 15 round split-decision, becoming the second Japanese boxer to capture the world light middleweight crown since Koichi Wajima.

Kudo defended his title three times including against Korean contender Ho Joo, before losing to undefeated challenger Ayub Kalule by unanimous decision for his only professional loss. He announced his retirement after the fight at only 28 years of age. His record was 23-1-0 (12KOs).

Kudo was possibly one of the least technically skilled champions in boxing history. He compensated for his lack of skill by displaying an enormous amount of stamina and strength, and retired without suffering a single knockdown.

Professional boxing record

See also
List of world light-middleweight boxing champions
List of Japanese boxing world champions
Boxing in Japan

References

External links

Masashi Kudo - CBZ Profile

 

|-

1951 births
Living people
Japanese male boxers
Sportspeople from Akita Prefecture
World Boxing Association champions
The Ring (magazine) champions
Middleweight boxers
World light-middleweight boxing champions